RalA-binding protein 1 is a protein that in humans is encoded by the RALBP1 gene.

Interactions 

RALBP1 has been shown to interact with:
 Cyclin B1, 
 HSF1,
 RALA, 
 RALB,  and
 REPS2.

References

Further reading